Central Pier may refer to:
Central Pier, Blackpool, UK
Central Pier, Melbourne Docklands, Australia
Central Piers, Hong Kong
Central Pier, Atlantic City, New Jersey, United States